Marisa Harvey (née Deguara; born 27 June 1975) is a Maltese former footballer who played as a defender. She has been a member of the Malta women's national team.

References

1975 births
Living people
Women's association football defenders
Maltese women's footballers
Malta women's international footballers
Mosta F.C. players